The Indiana Law Enforcement Academy (ILEA) is a law enforcement training academy located in Plainfield, Indiana. The governing body of the academy is the 17-member Law Enforcement Training Board who are appointed by the governor. The board sets the requirements and criteria for the basic training of law enforcement officers throughout the state, which became mandatory on July 6, 1972. The academy offers basic training for new police officers, jail officers, and town marshals. It also offers in-service training for police officers and executive training for police chiefs.

The basic training course for new police officers consists of over 600 hours of training. Major areas of instruction include criminal and traffic law, firearms, emergency vehicle operations, physical tactics, EMS awareness and human behavior. Officers are also required to study other police related subjects such as accident investigation, criminal investigation, domestic violence and sexual assault, water rescue training, Standardized Field Sobriety Test, crime prevention and drug and narcotics.

In addition to the main training academy in Plainfield, six satellite facilities are certified by the board to offer training courses throughout the state:

 Fort Wayne Police Academy  – Fort Wayne
 Indiana State Police Academy at ILEA  – Plainfield
 Indiana University Police Academy  – Bloomington
 Indianapolis Metropolitan Police Academy  – Indianapolis
 Northwest Indiana Law Enforcement Academy (NILEA)  – Hobart
 Southwest Indiana Law Enforcement Academy (SWILEA)  – Evansville

See also
 Law enforcement agencies in Indiana
Florida Criminal Justice Standards & Training Commission

References

External links
Indiana Law Enforcement Academy site

Law enforcement in Indiana
Police academies in the United States
1975 establishments in Indiana